Baba Hira Singh Bhattal Institute of Engineering and Technology (BHSBIET) is a college in Punjab. It was established in 2005.

References 

Engineering colleges in Punjab, India
Education in Sangrur
2005 establishments in Punjab, India
Educational institutions established in 2005